is a Japanese illustrator born in Yokohama. He is primarily known as a light novel illustrator. His pseudonym and circle "Left Side" comes from the fact that he predominantly uses his left hand.

He was awarded third place in the 2010 “Kono Light Novel ga Sugoi!” illustrator ranking.

Works

Character design

Games
 Remember 11: The Age of Infinity
 Atelier
 Atelier Ayesha: The Alchemist of Dusk
 Atelier Escha & Logy: Alchemists of the Dusk Sky
 Atelier Shallie: Alchemists of the Dusk Sea
 Toukiden
 Toukiden 2
 Fire Emblem
 Fire Emblem Echoes: Shadows of Valentia
 Fire Emblem Heroes
 Civilization Revolution 2+ (Vita, Asian physical release only)
 Fate/Grand Order

Anime
 Fractale
 Kamiuta (concept design, character design, director)
 Natsuiro Kiseki
 Room Mate
 Santa Company
 Vividred Operation (concept design)

Others
 EXIT TUNES' Vocaloid MAYU
 Lawson's Vocaloid Akikoloid-chan

Illustrations

Novels
  (Author: Hitoma Iruma, Dengeki Bunko)
  (Author: Tomono Shō)
  (Author: Akira)
  (Author: Hitoma Iruma, Dengeki Bunko)
  (Author: Hitoma Iruma, Media Works Bunko)
  (Author: Hitoma Iruma, Media Works Bunko)

Eyecatch
 Astarotte no Omocha! (episode 10)
 Atelier Escha & Logy (episode 12)
 Bubuki/Buranki (episode 11)
 Is the Order a Rabbit??'' (episode 10)

References

External links 
 
 

Japanese illustrators
Video game artists
People from Osaka Prefecture
Living people
1980 births